Centrosema virginianum is known by the common names of Spurred Butterfly Pea, wild blue vine, blue bell, and wild pea. C. virginianum is a member of the family Fabaceae, it is identified by its trailing and twining vine and showy flowers. C. virginianum habitats are in sunny areas within pine lands, and coastal uplands.

Description
Centrosema virginianum is a perennial herbaceous vine  growing procumbently or twining to a height approaching two meters. It has alternate pinnately divided leaves, 3 to 10 centimeters long. Leaflets are lanceolate or ovate, 1 to 4 cm long, Stipules are often deciduous, and mostly setaceous. There is a wide range of leaflet forms, from linear to ovate to oblong or lanceolate-oblong, acute or acuminate at the apex. Flowering occurs in the spring and summer.

Flowers of Centrosema virginianum, are highly specialized, with an inverted (resupinate) banner to accommodate pollinators (bees).  The inflorescence consists of one to four bisexual flowers on an axillary peduncle; the calyx is deeply five-lobed, and the acute lobes are longer than the tube. The corolla is purplish or lavender-blue to nearly white; the fruit contains four to ten dark brown seeds.  The diversity of leaflet shapes and corolla size and color can lead to confusion with C. pubescens. C. virginianum'''s roots are capable of nitrogen fixation.

DistributionC. virginianum'' ranges more or less continuously from Uruguay and northern Argentina to the eastern United States and Bermuda in tropical and subtropical areas. It is widely distributed throughout the West Indies and has become naturalized in tropical West Africa.

See also
 Clitoria, a vine with which Centrosema virginianum may be confused

References

Phaseoleae
Flora of North America
Flora of South America